The 1996 NCAA Men's Water Polo Championship was the 28th annual NCAA Men's Water Polo Championship to determine the national champion of NCAA men's collegiate water polo. Tournament matches were played at Canyonview Pool in La Jolla, San Diego, California during December 1996.

UCLA defeated USC in the final, 8–7, to win their fifth national title. The Bruins (24–6) were coached by Guy Baker.

The Most Outstanding Player of the tournament was Matt Swanson from UCLA. Swanson, along with seven other players, comprised the All-Tournament Team.

The tournament's leading scorers, with 5 goals each, were Hrvoje Cismic (USC), Brian Stahl (Massachusetts), and Marko Zagar (USC).

Qualification
Since there has only ever been one single national championship for water polo, all NCAA men's water polo programs (whether from Division I, Division II, or Division III) were eligible. A total of 4 teams were invited to contest this championship.

Bracket
Site: Canyonview Pool, La Jolla, San Diego, California

All-tournament team 
Jeremy Braxton-Brown, UCLA
Simun Cimerman, USC
Hrvoje Cizmic, USC
Corbin Graham, UCLA
Brian Stahl, Massachusetts
Matt Swanson, UCLA (Most outstanding player)
Jim Toring, UCLA
Marko Zagar, USC

See also 
 NCAA Men's Water Polo Championship

References

NCAA Men's Water Polo Championship
NCAA Men's Water Polo Championship
1996 in sports in California
December 1996 sports events in the United States
1996